Milzkalne is a village in Latvian Smārde parish administrative unit of the Engure municipality.  The village was added to the Smārde district in 1965 as a Soviet collective farm during the Soviet Latvia period.  The Šlokenbeka Castle, a medieval fortified manor built in the 15th century, is located in Milzkalne.

References

Sources

 

Villages in Latvia